The Zeta Psi Fraternity House at Lafayette College is a historic house located on the campus of Lafayette College in Easton, Northampton County, Pennsylvania. The house was built by the Tau Chapter of the Zeta Psi fraternity between 1909 and 1910 and is a -story, nine bay wide, rock-faced granite building with a dormered hipped roof. It features a heavy eave cornice, prominent chimney stacks, and projecting facade pavilions. The interior reflects both Colonial Revival and Arts and Crafts influenced in its design and detailing.

It was added to the National Register of Historic Places in 2001.

Beginning in September 2014, the house was unoccupied due to the suspension of Tau Chapter by Lafayette College for a period of five years. The Tau Chapter was to become officially recognized by the campus again in the Fall of 2018. The college started using the Zeta Psi Fraternity House as an all-male dormitory in the Fall of 2015, housing first year students. During its use as a dormitory, the college hosted several alumni and student events in the house. As of 2017, the Tau Chapter was expected to begin the process to become officially recognized by the campus again in the Fall of 2018. The Tau Chapter was officially recognized and reinstated by Lafayette College during the 2018 - 2019 academic year. The house is no longer used as a dormitory.

History and architectural features
Built between 1909 and 1910 at Lafayette College in Easton, Northampton County, Pennsylvania, the Zeta Psi Fraternity House is a -story, nine bay wide, rock-faced granite building with a dormered hipped roof. Its exterior features a heavy eave cornice, prominent chimney stacks, and projecting facade pavilions while its interior reflects both Colonial Revival and Arts and Crafts styles of architecture.

Placement of this structure on the National Register of Historic Places
The NRHP nomination application for the Zeta Psi Fraternity House at Lafayette College was formally reviewed by Pennsylvania's Historic Preservation Board at its March 13, 2001 meeting at 9:45 a.m. at the State Museum in Harrisburg. Also considered for NRHP status at this time were the: Protection of the Flag Monument in Athens, Pennsylvania; Normandy Farm, George K. Heller School and Upper Roxborough Historic District in Montgomery County; Awbury Historic District and Harris/Laird, Schober & Company Building in Philadelphia; Michael Derstine Farmstead in Bucks County; Chester Heights Camp Meeting Historic District in Delaware County; John Nicholas and Elizabeth Moyer House in Berks County; and the William Shelly School and Annex in York County.

It was then officially added to the National Register of Historic Places later in 2001.

Gallery

References

Houses on the National Register of Historic Places in Pennsylvania
Colonial Revival architecture in Pennsylvania
Houses completed in 1910
Houses in Northampton County, Pennsylvania
National Register of Historic Places in Northampton County, Pennsylvania
Fraternity and sorority houses